North Topsail Beach is a town in Onslow County, North Carolina, United States.  The 2010 population was 743. It is located on Topsail Island.  North Topsail Beach is part of the Jacksonville, North Carolina Metropolitan Statistical Area.

History
In the 1940s Ocean City was the one place in the area where African Americans could vacation or buy property. The idea came from white attorney Edgar L. Yow, who owned land in the area and talked to Black physician Samuel Gray. Wade H. Chestnut, who along with wife Caronell owned the first home there, was a leader in the community's development. In July 2022 a historical marker is planned which will be part of the state's Civil Rights Trail.

Geography
North Topsail Beach is located at  (34.476925, -77.461091).

In 2012, North Topsail Reef condominium installed over 2,200 hydraulically filled sandbags in order to protect their property pending beach nourishment.

Demographics

2020 census

As of the 2020 United States census, there were 1,005 people, 482 households, and 233 families residing in the town.

2000 census
As of the census of 2000, there were 843 people, 451 households, and 242 families residing in the city. The population density was 131.4 people per square mile (50.7/km2). There were 2,085 housing units at an average density of 324.9 per square mile (125.4/km2). The racial makeup of the city was 92.17% White, 4.74% African American, 0.47% Native American, 0.83% Asian, 0.47% from other races, and 1.30% from two or more races. Hispanic or Latino of any race were 0.83% of the population.

There were 451 households, out of which 9.5% had children under the age of 18 living with them, 47.7% were married couples living together, 4.2% had a female householder with no husband present, and 46.3% were non-families. 37.9% of all households were made up of individuals, and 9.3% had someone living alone who was 65 years of age or older. The average household size was 1.87 and the average family size was 2.37.

In the city the population was spread out, with 9.4% under the age of 18, 9.7% from 18 to 24, 30.7% from 25 to 44, 33.1% from 45 to 64, and 17.1% who were 65 years of age or older. The median age was 45 years. For every 100 females, there were 109.2 males. For every 100 females age 18 and over, there were 114.0 males.

The median income for a household in the city was $45,982, and the median income for a family was $53,125. Males had a median income of $36,522 versus $30,000 for females. The per capita income for the city was $33,972. About 5.5% of families and 8.6% of the population were below the poverty line, including 25.0% of those under age 18 and 4.4% of those age 65 or over.

References

External links
 Official website of North Topsail Beach, NC
 Topsail Island News, Real Estate & Events

Towns in North Carolina
Towns in Onslow County, North Carolina
Beaches of North Carolina
Landforms of Onslow County, North Carolina
Populated coastal places in North Carolina